1161 Thessalia, provisional designation , is a dark background asteroid from the outer regions of the asteroid belt, approximately 21 kilometers in diameter. It was discovered on 29 September 1929, by German astronomer Karl Reinmuth at the Heidelberg-Königstuhl State Observatory. It was named for the Greek region Thessaly.

Orbit and classification 

Thessalia is a non-family asteroid from the main belt's background population. It orbits the Sun in the outer main-belt at a distance of 2.9–3.4 AU once every 5 years and 8 months (2,065 days). Its orbit has an eccentricity of 0.09 and an inclination of 9° with respect to the ecliptic. The body's observation arc begins at Heidelberg, five weeks after its official discovery observation.

Physical characteristics

Diameter and albedo 

According to the survey carried out by the NEOWISE mission of NASA's Wide-field Infrared Survey Explorer, Thessalia measures 21.498 kilometers in diameter and its surface has an albedo of 0.065.

Lightcurves 

As of 2017, no rotational lightcurve of Thessalia has been obtained from photometric observations. The asteroid's rotation period, poles and shape remain unknown.

Naming 

This minor planet was named for the Thessaly region in eastern Greece. The subsequently numbered minor planet 1162 Larissa was named after the region's capital. The official naming citation was mentioned in The Names of the Minor Planets by Paul Herget in 1955.

References

External links 
 Asteroid Lightcurve Database (LCDB), query form (info )
 Dictionary of Minor Planet Names, Google books
 Asteroids and comets rotation curves, CdR – Observatoire de Genève, Raoul Behrend
 Discovery Circumstances: Numbered Minor Planets (1)-(5000) – Minor Planet Center
 
 

001161
Discoveries by Karl Wilhelm Reinmuth
Named minor planets
19290929